Pyridine nucleotide-disulphide oxidoreductase domain 1 is a protein that in humans is encoded by the PYROXD1 gene.

Function

This gene encodes a nuclear-cytoplasmic pyridine nucleotide-disulphide reductase (PNDR). PNDRs are flavoproteins that catalyze the pyridine nucleotide-dependent reduction of thiol residues in other proteins. The encoded protein belongs to the class I pyridine nucleotide-disulphide oxidoreductase family but lacks the C-terminal dimerization domain found in other family members and instead has a C-terminal nitrile reductase domain. It localizes to the nucleus and to striated sarcomeric compartments. Naturally occurring mutations in this gene cause early-onset myopathy with internalized nuclei and myofibrillar disorganization. A pseudogene of this gene has been defined on chromosome 11. [provided by RefSeq, Apr 2017].

References

Further reading